Corpora is a three times yearly peer-reviewed linguistic academic journal that publishes scholarly articles and book reviews on corpus linguistics, with a focus on corpus construction and corpus technology. It is edited by Tony McEnery (Lancaster University).

Aims and scope
The journal is concerned both with the construction of text corpora and their practical use across fields, disciplines and languages. Most emphasis is given to contributions devoted to corpus linguistic theories and methodologies.

Abstracting and indexing
The journal is indexed in the following services:
 Australian Research Council ERA 2010 Ranked Journal List 
 Bibliography of Linguistic Literature
 Directory of Lexicography Institutions
 EBSCO A-to-Z
 EBSCO Discovery Service 
 EBSCO TOC Premier 
 European Reference Index of Research Journals in the Humanities
 JournalTOCs 
 Linguistics Abstracts 
 Linguistics & Language Behavior Abstracts
 MLA International Bibliography

References

External links 
 

Publications established in 2006
Biannual journals
English-language journals
Corpus linguistics journals
Edinburgh University Press academic journals
Triannual journals